Chinchaga is a river in north-western Alberta.  It is a tributary of the Hay River.
Through the Hay River, its waters are carried to the Arctic Ocean via Great Slave Lake and Mackenzie River.  The name Chinchaga is First Nations, and means "Big Wood River".  Much of the Chinchaga watershed burned in 1950 during the Chinchaga fire.

Course 
Chinchaga River originates in the Chinchaga Lakes, a series of small lakes in the muskeg of north-eastern British Columbia, at an elevation of 795 m.  It flows east into Alberta, then continues north-east until west of Keg River, where it turns north.  It merges into the Hay River between Zama Lake and High Level, at an altitude of 325 m.  A series of oxbow lakes are formed on the lower course.  The approximate length of the river is 500 km, and the average discharge at its confluence with Hay River is 30 m³/s.

Tributaries 

 Lennard Creek
 Tanghe Creek
 Werniuck Creek
 Sloat Creek
 Vader Creek
 Thordarson Creek
 Waniandy Creek
 Haro River
 Haig River

Conservation and development 
Chinchaga Wildland Park is a large tract of land set aside by the Alberta Government for protection of the habitat of grizzly bears and woodland caribou, as well as nesting sites of trumpeter swan. However, the rest of the Chinchaga area is a well known hunting ground. Significant oil and gas fields (such as Hamburg) and logging are developed in the area.

See also 
 Geography of Alberta
 List of Alberta rivers

References

Rivers of Alberta